The House of Braganza-Saxe-Coburg and Gotha (also known as the House of Saxe-Coburg-Braganza or the Constitutional Branch of the Braganzas) is a term used to categorize the last four rulers of the Kingdom of Portugal, and their families, from 1853 until the declaration of the republic in 1910. Its name derives from the four kings descended in a patrilineal line from King Ferdinand II of Portugal (of the House of Saxe-Coburg and Gotha-Koháry) and in a matrilineal line from Queen Maria II of Portugal (of the House of Braganza).

The designation Braganza-Saxe-Coburg and Gotha is prevalent mainly in the writings of non-Portuguese historians and genealogists, as European custom classifies a descendant branch on the basis of patrilineal descent, which means that the House of Braganza-Saxe-Coburg and Gotha is a cadet branch of the House of Saxe-Coburg and Gotha-Koháry.

Nonetheless, the 1838 Portuguese constitution stated that the House of Braganza was the ruling house of Portugal, by way of Queen Maria II, and her descendants still continued to style themselves as members of the House of Braganza, as opposed to Saxe-Coburg-Braganza. With the death of King Manuel II without legitimate issue in 1932, the dynasty became extinct.

History
The royal house was founded by Prince Ferdinand of Saxe-Coburg and Gotha, who on 9 April 1836 married Queen Maria II of Portugal. Members of the royal house held the Portuguese title of Infante/Infanta of Portugal, as well as the German titles of Prince/ss of Saxe-Coburg and Gotha and Duke/Duchess of Saxony.  On 15 November 1853, Queen Maria II died, and her eldest son succeeded to the throne as Pedro V, the first king of the Braganza-Saxe-Coburg and Gotha dynasty.

The dynasty remained on the throne until the outbreak in Portugal of the 5 October 1910 revolution when King Manuel II of Portugal was deposed and the Portuguese First Republic was established. Manuel II went into exile in Fulwell Park, England, where he died on 2 July 1932.

Modern claims
Before his death in 1932, King Manuel II had been in negotiations with the rival Miguelist branch of the House of Braganza, who had claimed the Portuguese throne since 1834, in opposition to the Braganza-Saxe-Coburg and Gotha dynasty. On the King's death, the claim to the defunct throne of Portugal passed to Miguelist descendant Duarte Nuno of Braganza.

In 1932, a woman known as Maria Pia of Saxe-Coburg and Gotha Braganza claimed to be the illegitimate daughter of King Carlos I of Portugal and claimed the right to the titles of  Duchess of Braganza and to be the rightful Queen of Portugal. Maria Pia claimed that King Carlos I legitimized her through a royal decree and placed her in the line of succession, however no proof was presented to demonstrate this and the King similarly did not have the personal authority to do so. Maria Pia's paternity was never proven and her claim not widely accepted.

Rulers
Pedro V (1853–1861)
Luís I (1861–1889)
Carlos I (1889–1908)
Manuel II (1908–1910)

Family tree

See also 
 List of Portuguese monarchs

References

Further reading 
 PINTO, Albano Anthero da Silveira; VISCONDE, Augusto Romano Sanches de Baêna e Farinha; Resenha das familías titulares e grandes de Portugal (Volume 1). Lisboa: Empreza Editora de Francisco Arthur da Silva (1883). Pág. 313
 McCULLOCH, John Ramsay; A Dictionary, Geographical, Statistical, and Historical: of the various Countries, Places, and Principal Natural Objects in the World (Volume 4). Longmans: Green (1866). Pág. 14
 Almanach de Gotha. Justus Perthes Publishing House in Gotha; 175th ed.
 American Annals of Education (Volume 18). Otis: Broaders (1869).
 ROBINSON, James Harvey; BEARD, Charles Austin; The development of modern Europe: an introduction to the study of current history. Ginn & Company (1908). Pág. 27.
 The British Almanac: Containing Astronomical, Official and Other Information Relating to the British Isles, the Dominions Oversea and Foreign Countries. Stationers Company (1909). Pág. 457
 W.H. De Puy; The Century Reference Library of Universal Knowledge (Volume 8). National Newspapers Company (1909).
 ROLT-WHEELER, Francis; DRINKER, Frederick E.; The World War for Liberty: A Comprehensive and Authentic History of the War by Land, Sea and Air. C.H. Robinson Company (1919). Pág. 382
 COLENBRANDER, Herman Theodoor; deel. Algemeene koloniale geschiedenis. M. Nijhoff (1925). Pág. 26.
 Current History (Volume 38). New York Times Company (1933). Pág. 239.
 The Catholic Encyclopedia: Laprade-Mass. Appleton (1950). Pág. 282.
 FRANCIS, John Michael (Editor); Iberia and the Americas: Culture, Politics, and History (Transatlantic Relations), 3 Volumes Set. ABC-CLIO (November 21, 2005). Págs. 724 e 1112.
 OLIVEIRA, Barradas de; Quando os cravos murcham (Volume 2). Edições FP (1984). Pág. 41.
 FIGUEIREDO, Fidelino de; Revista de História (Volumes 10-11). Emprêsa Literária Fluminense (1921). Pág. 220.
 PAILLER, Jean; Maria Pia of Braganza: The Pretender. New York: ProjectedLetters, 2006;
 CHILCOTE, Ronald H.; The Portuguese Revolution: State and Class in the Transition to Democracy, page 37. Rowman & Littlefield Publishers; Reprint edition (August 31, 2012).

External links 

 

 
1836 establishments in Portugal
1932 disestablishments in Portugal